Leoma is an unincorporated community and census-designated place located in Lawrence County, Tennessee, United States.  It is situated along U.S. Route 43 between Loretto and Lawrenceburg.

The G.T. Wilburn Grist Mill is in Leoma.  The community is also home to an elementary school, the Lawrence County Archives, Hope Botanical Garden, and a post office (zip code 38468).

The 2020 population of the CDP was 464.

Demographics

References

Unincorporated communities in Tennessee
Unincorporated communities in Lawrence County, Tennessee